William James Holland (April 10, 1914 – February 26, 2000) was an American professional basketball player. He played in the National Basketball League for the Warren Penns, Cleveland White Horses, and Detroit Eagles and averaged 5.2 points per game.

References

1914 births
2000 deaths
American men's basketball players
Basketball players from Pennsylvania
Centers (basketball)
Cleveland White Horses players
Detroit Eagles players
Forwards (basketball)
Edinboro Fighting Scots men's basketball players
Elmira Colonels (basketball) players
People from Greenville, Pennsylvania
Warren Penns players